Loimwe Protected Area is a protected area in Myanmar's Shan State, covering . It was established in 1996 and is managed by the Forest Department of Kengtung Township.

References

External links
Myanmar - Status of Biodiversity Conservation
Biodiversity and protected areas - Myanmar

Protected areas established in 1996
Protected areas of Myanmar
Daen Lao Range